World Wild 2010 (stylized as WORLD WILD 2010 and pronounced as World Wild two-o-one-zero) is the second full-length album by Japanese electronica singer and lyricist Saori@destiny. The album was released in Japan on April 14, 2010 by D-topia Entertainment. The album charted and peaked at its debut position of No. 35 in Oricon daily charts and No. 129 in Oricon weekly charts, selling 812 copies, though the album only charted for a week, making it her highest-charting release yet. This is Saori@destiny's current highest selling album.

On June 30, 2010, the album was made available through iTunes internationally, making World Wild 2010 the first ever D-topia album to be released and distributed worldwide.

Background 
WORLD WILD 2010 marks a change in Saori@destiny's previously-established musical style by incorporating foreign genres of dance music. Brazilian funk carioca and Indonesian funkot were advertised in the album's tagline, and greater emphasis is placed on organic instrument sounds.

The decision to release the album globally through iTunes was taken by Saori's management after she received a message from an international Saori@destiny fan community via Mixi.

Track listing
 "Re:Revolution" (0:42)
 "World Wild 2010" (2:36)
 "Ethnic Planet Survival"* (エスニック・プラネット・サバイバル ; Esunikku Puranetto Sabaibaru) (3:59)
 "I Can't" (5:07)
 "Lonely Lonely Lonely"*  (3:21)
 "Play" (3:03)
 "Baby Tell Me" (3:44)
 "Funny Parade" (ファニー・パレード ; Fanii Pareedo) (3:32)
 "Grotesque" (グロテスク ; Gurotesuku) (3:26)
 "Prism" (プリズム ; Purisumu) (3:53)
 "Shinpa" (シンパ ; Shinpa) (3:16)
 "Lonely Lonely Lonely" (FUNKOT.JP remix) Remixed by DJ Jet Barong a.k.a. 政所 (Mandokoro) (6:54)
* Promotional single

Charts

Sales and certifications

Release history

References

External links
Saori@destiny discography page 
Official Website
WORLD WILD 2010 detail at iTunes US

2010 albums
J-pop albums
Japanese-language albums
Saori@destiny albums
Avex Group albums
Victor Entertainment albums